The R277 road is a regional road in Ireland linking the R292 road from just outside Strandhill to Sligo Airport (Strandhill) in County Sligo. The airport access section of the road, Airport Road, is the site of the Sligo Airport Business Park, a technology and enterprise centre hosting 17 companies.

See also
Roads in Ireland

References

Regional roads in the Republic of Ireland
Roads in County Sligo